The Daily Northern Standard was an evening newspaper published in Townsville, Queensland, Australia.

History
The first issue was published on 1 October 1883. It ceased publication on 14 April 1887.

References

Defunct newspapers published in Queensland
Townsville
Daily newspapers published in Australia
Publications established in 1883
Publications disestablished in 1887
1883 establishments in Australia
1887 disestablishments in Australia